7 Up (stylized as 7up outside North America) or Seven Up is an American brand of lemon-lime-flavored non-caffeinated soft drink. The brand and formula are owned by Keurig Dr Pepper although the beverage is internationally distributed by PepsiCo.

History

7 Up was created by Charles Leiper Grigg, who launched his St. Louis–based company The Howdy Corporation in 1920. Grigg came up with the formula for a lemon-lime soft drink in 1929. The product, originally named "Bib-Label Lithiated Lemon-Lime Soda", was launched two weeks before the Wall Street Crash of 1929. It contained lithium citrate, a mood-stabilizing drug, until 1948. It was one of a number of patent medicine products popular in the late-19th and early-20th centuries. Its name was later shortened to "7 Up Lithiated Lemon Soda" before being further shortened to just "7 Up" by 1936.

The origin of the revised name is unclear. Britvic claims that the name comes from the seven main ingredients in the drink, while others have claimed that the number was a coded reference to the lithium contained in the original recipe, which has an atomic mass of 7. Britvic also claims that the name alluded  to 7 Up 7-ounce bottles when Coca-Cola and most other soft drinks were bottled in 6-ounce bottles.

The 7 Up company was privately owned by its founding families until it was sold in 1978 to Philip Morris, which sold it in 1986 in two parts: the international division to PepsiCo and the US business to a group led by the investment firm Hicks & Haas. In the US, 7 Up merged with Dr Pepper in 1988; Cadbury Schweppes bought the combined company in 1995. The Dr Pepper Snapple Group was spun off from Cadbury Schweppes in 2008; it merged with Keurig Green Mountain in 2018 to form Keurig Dr Pepper.

Consumption
7 Up is commonly consumed cold refrigerated or with ice. It is also used as a mixer for highball alcoholic lemon-lime soda cocktails, including the 7 and 7 (Seagram's 7 Crown and 7 Up) and CC and Seven (Canadian Club whisky and 7 Up). 7 Up is also used in both alcoholic and non-alcoholic punches.

Formula
7 Up has been reformulated several times since its launch in 1929. In 2006, the version of the product sold in the U.S. was reformulated so it could be marketed as being "100% natural". This was achieved by eliminating the chelating agent Calcium disodium EDTA, and replacing sodium citrate with potassium citrate to reduce the beverage's sodium content. This reformulation contains no fruit juice and, in the U.S., is sweetened with high-fructose corn syrup (HFCS). The manufacturing process used in the production of HFCS has led some public health and advocacy groups to challenge the ad campaign's "natural" claims. In 2007, after the Center for Science in the Public Interest threatened to sue 7 Up, it was announced that 7 Up would stop being marketed as "100% natural". Instead, it is now promoted as having "100% Natural Flavors". The controversy does not extend to other countries, such as the United Kingdom, where HFCS is not generally used in foods, including 7 Up. In 2011, 7 Up began test marketing a formula, called 7 Up Retro, using sugar rather than HFCS.  Container labels sport the caption, "Made With Real Sugar".

Variations

7 Up Ten: Introduced in 2013, along with "Ten" variations for most of the major Dr. Pepper/Seven-Up brands, this contains 10 calories. It is a blend using high fructose corn syrup along with aspartame and acesulfame potassium to sweeten it.

Tropical 7 Up:  This is a pineapple/mango-flavored 7 Up, introduced in 2014 for a limited time, as well as a return in 2015 with newer branding.

7 Up Retro: This 2011 formulation uses sugar rather than HFCS as its sweetener. Introduced on the 2011 season finale of The Apprentice, packaging in 12-oz. cans features either the 1970s disco mirrorball-themed logo or the 1980s logo. It is also available in 12-oz. glass bottles with a label inspired by 7 Up's original logo.

7 Up Zero Sugar / Diet 7 Up: 7 Up's first diet variation was originally introduced in 1963 as Like (not to be confused with 7 Up's Like Cola from the 1980s). However, it was discontinued in 1969 due to the U.S. government ban of cyclamate sweetener. After reformulation, it was reintroduced as Diet 7 Up in 1970. It was renamed Sugar Free 7 Up in 1973 then back to Diet 7 Up in 1979. Diet 7 Up was reformulated and advertised as being sweetened with Splenda (sucralose); the formula has been retooled and listed these ingredients: filtered carbonated water, natural flavors, citric acid, potassium citrate, potassium benzoate, aspartame, acesulfame potassium, calcium disodium EDTA.  The ingredients for Diet 7 Up with Splenda are: filtered carbonated water, natural flavors, citric acid, potassium citrate, potassium benzoate, calcium disodium EDTA, acesulfame potassium, sucralose. The 7 Up Company claims they switched back to aspartame because they conducted a nationwide study showing that people preferred the taste with aspartame instead of with Splenda. The beverage was rebranded as 7 Up Zero Sugar in late 2020.

Cherry 7 Up: A cherry-flavored variant, it was introduced in 1987. Cherry 7 Up flavor, with these ingredients listed for the United States version: Carbonated water, high fructose corn syrup, citric acid, natural and artificial flavors, potassium benzoate, red 40. One known ingredient among the "natural and artificial flavors" is apple juice. The version sold in the United States is colored pink and comes in a clear bottle, while the international version is colorless and currently comes in a pink bottle. It was renamed and reformulated as Cherry 7 Up Antioxidant in January 2009; however, the soda's antioxidant line was pulled from shelves in 2012 amid a controversy about the rumored detrimental health effects of consuming antioxidant drinks. The original Cherry 7 Up was reintroduced at the same time.

Cherry 7 Up Zero Sugar / Diet Cherry 7 Up: Diet Cherry 7 Up was reintroduced in 2006 due to popular demand after having been pulled from shelves with the introduction of 7 Up Plus Cherry.  Ingredients are: filtered carbonated water and contains 2% or less of each of the following: citric acid, natural and artificial flavors, potassium benzoate (protects flavor), aspartame, potassium citrate, acesulfame potassium, red 40. Phenylketonurics: Contains phenylalanine. Diet Cherry 7 Up was rebranded as Cherry 7 Up Zero Sugar in late 2020.

Orange 7 Up: This flavor was available for a short time in Norway during the mid-1990s. It was released at the same time as Raspberry 7 Up. It was a clear-colored lemon-, lime-, and orange-flavored soft drink. It was pulled off the market after 2–3 years. Today, Orange 7 Up can still be bought in Austria. , it is available in the Netherlands.

Raspberry 7 Up: This flavor was available for a short time in Norway and Denmark (and possibly other European countries) during the late '80s. It was released at the same time as Orange 7 Up. It was a clear  lemon-, lime-, and raspberry-flavoured soft drink. It was pulled off the European market after 2–3 years, but can still be found in several Southeast Asian countries such as Singapore.

7 Up Free: 7 Up Free is sold in Iceland, UK, Ireland, Mexico, Spain, Norway, Sweden, Argentina,  Finland, UAE, Uruguay, Pakistan, the Netherlands, Thailand, France and Germany. It contains no caffeine, sugar, colorings, or preservatives, and is marketed as "Natural Lemon and Lime Flavour" similar to the "100% natural" American version. It contains a combination of artificial sugars, and for eight years was the only variety on the Norwegian market. The lack of the usual light or zero-label is confusing to Norwegian consumers, who often buy it not knowing they are buying a product with artificial sugars. In the UK, 7 Up Free has been sold in a 600-ml, rather than 500-ml bottle since early 2010. This is part of 7 Up's UK manufacturer Britvic's healthy-living push whereby sugar-free product versions are sold in a larger bottle.

7 Up Light: In international markets, PepsiCo sells 7 Up Light as the diet version of 7 Up.

7 Up Lime: 7 Up Lime is sold in the U.S. and Argentina. In the U.S., it is not as strong and is less carbonated. In Argentina, it is much more carbonated and has 5% lime juice.

7 Up Cherry:  7 Up Cherry is a variant currently available in the UK and France. It is a different drink from Cherry 7 Up and uses a different recipe.

7 UP Revive: 7 UP Revive is a variant of the 7 UP brand which is available in India (launched in 2015) and Laos and is marketed as a hydrotonic.

Salted Lemon 7 Up: Salted Lemon 7 Up is a drink originating in Hong Kong, which is made of salted lemon and 7 Up. It is a common drink that can be found in dai pai dong and cha chaan teng. It is also named one of the Hong Kong summer drinks by Cathay Pacific Discovery.

7 Up Mojito Flavour: This flavour was launched in France in 2014 and has also been available in the UK and Ireland since early 2016. The version sold in the UK is based on 7 Up Free and contains no sugar, colour, or caffeine.

Barbecue sauces and marinades
In 2007, Cadbury Schweppes entered into a licensing partnership with Vita Food Products to produce a line of barbecue sauces and marinades flavored with Dr Pepper, 7 Up, and A&W Root Beer.

Discontinued
7 Up Gold: 7 Up Gold was marketed for a short time in 1988 as a spice-flavored beverage, similar to Vernor's Ginger Ale. Though 7 Up's marketing slogan at that time was "Never Had It, Never Will" (referring to caffeine), 7 Up Gold included caffeine as an ingredient. It was introduced by 7 Up in the hopes of capturing 1% of the cola market, which at the time was $26.6 billion.  However, it only captured 0.1% of the market because people were confused by 7 Up marketing a dark-colored soft drink with caffeine, so it was cancelled. The 7 Up Gold recipe was actually an unused Dr Pepper invention.

7 Up Ice Cola: Introduced in 1995 by Pepsi for the international market, it was a clear cola, in essence a repackaging of Crystal Pepsi. It was not as popular as hoped and was cancelled.

dnL / 7 Upside Down: Sold in the United States, dnL was introduced in September 2002, during the same year as other attempts to extend soft drink brand names with new variations, including Pepsi Blue, Dr Pepper Red Fusion, and Vanilla Coke. dnL was scheduled to be cancelled for 2006 in favor of the "7 Up Plus" brand. The product's name came from the fact that the "dnL" logo is the "7 Up" logo turned upside down. The product itself was also, in many ways, the opposite of 7 Up: while 7 Up is caffeine-free, colorless, and comes in a green bottle, dnL contained caffeine and was an unusual shade of green (vaguely similar to the green of 7 Up's bottle) in a clear bottle.  And while 7 Up has a fairly standard lemon-lime flavor, the "citrus" flavor of dnL is that of lime-lemon, (primarily lime flavored with a hint of lemon).

7 Up Plus: A successor to dnL, 7 Up Plus was touted as a healthy alternative, containing no caffeine and has 2 grams of carbohydrates per serving, as well as 5% apple juice, which is uncommon among American market carbonated beverages. It is sweetened with Splenda. The original flavor, Mixed Berry, was released in summer 2004. Two additional flavors have been added to the line: Cherry and Island Fruit. In Ireland in 2007, 7 Up launched a range of flavored water.

7 Up Citrus Splash: Available in Canada from PepsiCo, citrus and lemon-lime.

7 Up Lemon Squeeze: Available in Canada from PepsiCo, similar to Sierra Mist Lemon Squeeze

7 Up Tropical: Available in France from PepsiCo

7 Up Tropical Splash: Available in Canada from PepsiCo in the early 2000s.

7 Up Pomegranate: Available in the US once a year during the holidays

7 Up Frootaz: Tropical flavor variant available in the Philippines marketed by PepsiCo for a short time in the 2000s, and then cancelled

7 Up Yerbabuena: Available for a limited time only in Colombia in 2013

7 Up H2OH!: Lightly carbonated water sold outside the US, and available only in: Latin America, Malaysia, the UK, and Ireland in the late 2000s, and cancelled in the early 2010s. In Brazil it is sold under the brand H2OH! in some flavours, as Citrus, lime and apple, orange.

Advertising campaigns

Metal pedestrian crossing markers saying "Drink 7up Safety First" were installed in many U.S. cities in the 1930s.

One of the slogans used was "You like it – It Likes you" which appeared on a large sign that for many years was outside Pontchartrain Beach in New Orleans.

Fresh-Up Freddie was the rooster mascot for 7 Up in the 1950s. He gave viewers lessons about how to plan successful parties and picnics by having plenty of 7 Up on hand. The commercials were produced by Disney, giving the character the specific Disney look of the time. Freddie has been described as a hybrid of the rooster Panchito Pistoles from The Three Caballeros and the zany Aracuan Bird from the same film. He often was dressed in human clothes. Freddie also appeared in the 1957 Zorro TV series' commercial intermissions. In these commercials, Freddie fought with Pete the Cat. Freddie, who was featured in a small amount of  merchandising, was voiced by Paul Frees.

In the 1970s and 1980s, Geoffrey Holder appeared in television ads as part of 7 Up's "Uncola" ad campaign, designed to highlight differences between 7 Up and other soft drinks on the market with cola flavoring.  In the ads, Geoffrey holds a pair of cola nuts in one hand and a lemon & lime (used to flavor 7 Up) in the other hand and describes them as "Uncola nuts."

In 1987, 7 Up introduced Spot, the red-orange dot in the 7 Up logo anthropomorphized into a mascot. The character was used heavily in advertising and licensed items across the U.S., including the 1993 platform video game Cool Spot.

The television cartoon character Fido Dido was used as a mascot from the late 1980s through the early 1990s, and was reintroduced in international markets in the early 2000s.

In 1991, 7 Up sponsored Jordan Grand Prix's Jordan 191, the car in which Michael Schumacher drove his first Formula One race.

In the early 2000s, Orlando Jones served as the spokesperson for 7 Up in the United States in a series of commercials. Notably, one commercial had him wear a t-shirt that had 7 Up's then-slogan Make 7 Up Yours divided between the front and back with the double entendre on the back that featured the Up Yours part; 7 Up would sell the shirt through specialty retailer Spencer Gifts for many years.

From the years 2002 to 2009, The 7 Up Christmas on Ice was an annual ice rink event taking place in several towns and cities around Ireland. More than 90,000 people attended the event in Smithfield, Dublin.

The current 7 Up logo includes a red-orange circle between the "7" and "Up"; this red-orange circle has been animated and used as a mascot for the brand as Cool Spot. Before that, the mascot was a fictional character named Fido Dido created by Joanna Ferrone and Sue Rose. He is used outside the U.S. for limited time retro cups, although the last time and location is not known.}

Corporate sponsorship 
In 1974 7 Up became	The Jerry Lewis MDA Labor Day Telethon's first corporate sponsor, at a time when its sponsorship was generally limited	to trade unions and civic organizations.

See also
 Fizz-nik
 Vess

References

External links

 
 7Up page on PepsiCo International UK & Ireland
 7 Up (undetermined source of product name from Snopes.com)

Products introduced in 1929
Cherry sodas
Keurig Dr Pepper brands
Lemon-lime sodas
Patent medicines
PepsiCo brands